"Battleship Chains" is a song written by Terry Anderson and recorded by his band The Woods. It was covered and made famous by the band The Georgia Satellites in 1986.  Appearing on their debut album, It reached number 86 on the Billboard Hot 100.  The song also appeared on the album Hindu Love Gods by the band Hindu Love Gods, a collaboration between members of R.E.M. and Warren Zevon.

The song also features on The Wildhearts covers album Stop Us If You've Heard This One Before Vol 1.

Chart performance

Izzy Stradlin has also covered this song when playing live with Rick Richards.

Danish metal band Volbeat has also covered the song on their 2016 album, Seal the Deal & Let's Boogie.

References 

1986 songs
Song recordings produced by Jeff Glixman
The Georgia Satellites songs